Square kilometre (International spelling as used by the International Bureau of Weights and Measures) or square kilometer (American spelling), symbol km2, is a multiple of the square metre, the SI unit of area or surface area.

1 km2 is equal to:
 1,000,000 square metres (m2)
 100 hectares (ha)
It is also approximately equal to:
 0.3861 square miles 
 247.1 acres 

Conversely:
1 m2 = 0.000001 (10−6) km2
1 hectare = 0.01 (10−2) km2
1 square mile =  
1 acre = about  

The symbol "km2" means (km)2, square kilometre or kilometre squared and not k(m2), kilo–square metre. For example, 3 km2 is equal to  = 3,000,000 m2, not 3,000 m2.

Examples of areas of 1 square kilometre

Topographical Map grids
Topographical map grids are worked out in metres, with the grid lines being 1,000 metres apart.
  1:100,000 maps are divided into squares representing 1 km2, each square on the map being one square centimetre in area and representing 1 km2 on the surface of the earth.
  For 1:50,000 maps, the grid lines are 2 cm apart. Each square on the map is 2 cm by 2 cm (4 cm2) and represents 1 km2 on the surface of the earth.
  For 1:25,000 maps, the grid lines are 4 cm apart. Each square on the map is 4 cm by 4 cm (16 cm2) and represents 1 km2 on the surface of the earth.
In each case, the grid lines enclose one square kilometre.

Medieval city centres

The area enclosed by the walls of many European medieval cities were about one square kilometre. These walls are often either still standing or the route they followed is still clearly visible, such as in Brussels, where the wall has been replaced by a ring road, or in Frankfurt, where the wall has been replaced by gardens. The approximate area of the old walled cities can often be worked out by fitting the course of the wall to a rectangle or an oval (ellipse). Examples include
Delft, Netherlands (See map alongside) 
The walled city of Delft was approximately rectangular.
A perfect rectangle with these measurements has an area of 1.30×0.75 = 0.9 km2

Lucca (Italy) 
The medieval city is roughly rectangular with rounded north-east and north-west corners.
A perfect rectangle of these dimensions would be 1.36×0.80 = 1.088 km2.

Bruges (Belgium) 
The medieval city of Bruges, a major centre in Flanders, was roughly oval or elliptical in shape with the longer or semi-major axis running north and south.
A perfect ellipse of these dimensions would be 2.53 × 1.81 × (π/4) = 3.597 km2.

Chester United Kingdom 
Chester is one of the smaller English cities that has a near-intact city wall.
The distance from Northgate to Watergate is about 855 metres.
The distance from Eastgate to Westgate is about 589 metres.
A perfect rectangle of these dimensions would be (855/1000) × (589/1000) = 0.504 km2.

Parks
Parks come in all sizes; a few are almost exactly one square kilometre in area. Here are some examples:
 Riverside Country Park, UK.
 Brierley Forest Park, UK.
 Rio de Los Angeles State Park, California, USA 
 Jones County Central Park, Iowa, USA.
 Kiest Park, Dallas, Texas, USA 
 Hole-in-the-Wall Park & Campground, Grand Manan Island, Bay of Fundy, New Brunswick, Canada 
 Downing Provincial Park, British Columbia, Canada 
 Citadel Park, Poznan, Poland 
 Sydney Olympic Park, Sydney, Australia, contains 6.63 square kilometres of wetlands and waterways.

Golf courses
Using the figures published by golf course architects Crafter and Mogford, a course should have a fairway width of 120 metres and 40 metres clear beyond the hole. Assuming a  18-hole course, an area of 80 hectares (0.8 square kilometre) needs to be allocated for the course itself.  Examples of golf courses that are about one square kilometre include:
 Manchester Golf Club, UK 
  Northop Country Park, Wales, UK 
  The Trophy Club, Lebanon, Indiana, US 
 Qingdao International Country Golf Course, Qingdao, Shandong, China
 Arabian Ranches Golf Club, Dubai 
 Sharm el Sheikh Golf Courses: Sharm el Sheikh, South Sinai, Egypt 
 Belmont Golf Club, Lake Macquarie, NSW, Australia

Other areas of one square kilometre or thereabouts
 The Old City of Jerusalem is almost 1 square kilometre in area.
Milton Science Park, Oxfordshire, UK.
 Mielec Industrial Park,  Mielec, Poland 
 The Guildford Campus of Guildford Grammar School, South Guildford, Western Australia
 Sardar Vallabhbhai National Institute of Technology (SVNIT), Surat, India 
 Île aux Cerfs Island,  near the east coast of Mauritius.
Peng Chau Island, Hong Kong

See also
Conversion of units
SI prefix for the precise meaning of the prefix "k"
Square Kilometre Array, a proposed radio telescope in South Africa or Australia, which is intended to have a collecting area of approximately 1 km2

Notes

References

Units of area
SI derived units